The Rehoboth Volksparty was a political party in Namibia. It was founded in 1968 by Hans Diergaardt, on the basis of the Rehoboth Taxpayers Association.

In 1971, the RVP joined the National Convention. In August 1976 the party is merged into the South West Africa People's Organisation (SWAPO).

In February 1989, the RVP was reconstituted by Arrie Hermanus Smit.
Defunct political parties in Namibia
Rehoboth, Namibia
Political parties established in 1968
1968 establishments in South West Africa